Varieties of Anomalous Experience: Examining the Scientific Evidence is a book edited by Etzel Cardeña, Steven Jay Lynn and Stanley Krippner and published by the American Psychological Association. The first edition was published in 2000 and a second edition in 2014. The book is dedicated to the research of William James.

The authors of the book explore "anomalous experiences" defined as unusual but not necessarily psychopathological phenomena that  may hold great significance for those who have them. The book focuses on psychological and neuroscientific research on the experiences, rather than on their ontological nature, and includes near-death experiences, out-of-body experiences, hallucinations, lucid dreams,  mysticism, psi-events, and reincarnation. The second edition has 14 chapters written by twenty-two contributors. It has a clear and readable style which makes it suitable for a general audience.

See also
Extra-Sensory Perception 
Parapsychology: Frontier Science of the Mind
The Conscious Mind
Irreducible Mind

References

2000 non-fiction books
Parapsychology
American Psychological Association books
Edited volumes